María Far Núñez (born January 6, 1998) is a Panamanian swimmer. She competed at the 2016 Summer Olympics in the women's 200 metre butterfly event; her time of 2:23.89 in the heats did not qualify her for the semifinals.

References

1998 births
Living people
Panamanian female swimmers
Olympic swimmers of Panama
Swimmers at the 2016 Summer Olympics
Swimmers at the 2014 Summer Youth Olympics
Swimmers at the 2015 Pan American Games
Female butterfly swimmers
Pan American Games competitors for Panama
20th-century Panamanian women
21st-century Panamanian women